Shannon Boyd (born 9 September 1992) is a former Australian professional rugby league footballer who last played as a  for the Gold Coast Titans in the NRL, and has played for Australia at international level.

Boyd played for the Canberra Raiders and the Gold Coast Titans in the National Rugby League. He played for NSW Country in 2016.

Playing career
Boyd was born in Goulburn, New South Wales, Australia.

He played his junior football for the Cowra Magpies before being signed by the Canberra Raiders. He played for their NYC team from 2010 to 2012. Boyd played for the New South Wales Under 18s team and, in 2012, the Under 20s team.

2014
In Round 1, Boyd made his NRL debut for the Raiders off the interchange bench against the North Queensland Cowboys in a 28-22 loss at 1300SMILES Stadium. In Round 6 against the Newcastle Knights, Boyd scored his first NRL try in a 26-12 loss at Canberra Stadium. On 23 April, Boyd re-signed with the Raiders, keeping him at the club till the end of the 2017 season. He scored one try from his 24 appearances in his debut season and was named the Raiders Rookie of the Year at the Meninga Medal presentation night.

2015
In May, Boyd was selected as 18th man for New South Wales Country. In Round 22 against the Wests Tigers, he scored his first career double in the first half of the match in the Raiders' 20-18 loss at Canberra Stadium. He finished the season with 20 matches and 5 tries. He was named in the Prime Minister's XIII train-on squad but was later ruled out due to injury. On 27 October, he re-signed with the Raiders on a 3-year contract.

2016
In the pre-season, Boyd was named in the Raiders' Auckland Nines squad. On 8 May, Boyd started at prop for New South Wales Country against New South Wales City. During the season, Boyd was being recognised as being the one of the in-form props of the competition, showing some great performances up front to lead the Raiders to a 10-match winning streak towards the finals. Boyd played in 26 matches and scored 2 tries for the Raiders. He was rewarded for his big season by being selected in the 24-man Australian Kangaroos squad for the Four Nations. On 15 October, Boyd made his international debut for Australia against New Zealand, where he started at prop in the 26-6 win at nib Stadium in Perth. Boyd played in 4 matches of the tournament including playing off the interchange bench in the Kangaroos 34-8 Final win against New Zealand at Anfield.

2017
In April 2017, Boyd was selected to fill in the interchange bench for the Kangaroos after Raiders teammate Josh Papalii was axed for drink-driving but later was selected as 18th man after coach Mal Meninga opted to select Jake Trbojevic for the void bench spot in their 2017 ANZAC Test clash against New Zealand. Boyd had a more of a less exciting 2017 NRL season with him playing in 23 matches for the Raiders.

2018 
On 16 May, Boyd has signed a 4-year deal with the Gold Coast Titans starting at 2019.

2019
On 5 August, Boyd was ruled out for the rest of the 2019 NRL season after suffering a shoulder injury which required surgery.  Boyd made a total of 13 appearances for the Gold Coast in his first season at the club.

References

External links

Gold Coast Titans profile
Canberra Raiders profile
Raiders profile

1992 births
Living people
Australia national rugby league team players
Australian rugby league players
Canberra Raiders players
Country New South Wales Origin rugby league team players
Gold Coast Titans players
Mount Pritchard Mounties players
Rugby league props